Ecker is a surname. Notable people with the name include:

Alexander Ecker (1816-1877), German anthropologist and anatomist
Danny Ecker (born 1977), German pole vaulter
Donnie Ecker (born 1986), American baseball coach
Enrique Ecker (1923-1990), American football player
Gerhard Ecker (born 1962), Austrian medicinal chemist and professor
Guy Ecker (born 1959), American-Brazilian actor
Haylie Ecker (born 1975), Australian violinist
Janet Ecker (born 1953), Canadian politician
John Ecker (born 1948), German-American basketball player and coach
Johnny Ecker (born 1973), French footballer
Paul Ecker (1913-1979), German World War II officer
William Ecker (1924-2009), US Navy aviator
Wolfert Acker or Ecker (1667–1753), American colonial clergyman

See also
Eker (surname)
Eckert (disambiguation), includes list of people with surname Eckert
Eckler, surname

Surnames from given names